Leslie Roy Porter (24 August 1917 – 6 February 1998) was an Australian rules footballer who played with Footscray and South Melbourne in the Victorian Football League (VFL).

Family
The son of Robert Clyde Porter (1891–1963) and May Elizabeth Porter, nee Johnson (1892–1976), Leslie Roy Porter was born at Footscray in August 1917.

Porter married Nancy Nerrida Mallows in 1941.

War service
Porter served in both the Australian Army and the Royal Australian Air Force during World War II.

Notes

External links 

1917 births
1998 deaths
Australian rules footballers from Melbourne
Western Bulldogs players
Sydney Swans players
West Footscray Football Club players
People from Footscray, Victoria
Royal Australian Air Force personnel of World War II
Australian Army personnel of World War II
Military personnel from Melbourne